The 2016 United States House of Representatives elections in Tennessee was held on November 8, 2016, to elect the nine U.S. representatives from the state of Tennessee, one from each of the state's nine congressional districts. The elections coincided with the elections of other federal and state offices, including President of the United States. The primaries were held on August 4.

Following the 2016 elections, no seats changed hands, leaving the Tennessee delegation at a 7-2 Republican majority.

Overview

|-
! 
|  | 
| 
| 
| 2008
| Incumbent re-elected.
| nowrap |   (Republican) 78.4%Alam Bohms (Democratic) 15.4%Robert Franklin (Independent) 6.2%
|-
! 
|  | 
| 
| 
| 1988
| Incumbent re-elected.
| nowrap |   (Republican) 75.6%Stuart Starr (Democratic) 24.4%
|-
! 
|  | 
| 
| 
| 2010
| Incumbent re-elected.
| nowrap |   (Republican) 66.4%Melody Shekari (Democratic) 28.8%Cassandra Mitchell (Independent) 1.9%Rick Tyler (Independent) 1.9%
|-
! 
|  | 
| 
| 
| 2010
| Incumbent re-elected.
| nowrap |   (Republican) 65.0%Steven Reynolds (Democratic) 35.0%
|-
! 
|  | 
| 
| 
| 19821994 2002
| Incumbent re-elected.
| nowrap |   (Democratic) 62.6%Stacy Ries Snyder (Republican) 37.4%
|-
! 
|  | 
| 
| 
| 2010
| Incumbent re-elected.
| nowrap |   (Republican) 71.1%David Kent (Democratic) 21.8%David Ross (Independent) 7.1%
|-
! 
|  | 
| 
| 
| 2002
| Incumbent re-elected.
| nowrap |   (Republican) 72.2%Tharon Chandler (Democratic) 23.5%Leonard Ladner (Independent) 4.3%
|-
! 
|  | 
| 
| 
| 2010
|  | Incumbent retired.Republican hold.
| nowrap |   (Republican) 68.8%Rickey Hobson (Democratic) 25.1%Shelia Godwin (Independent) 2.3%James Hart (Independent) 1.4%
|-
! 
|  | 
| 
| 
| 2006
| Incumbent re-elected.
| nowrap |   (Democratic) 78.7%Paul Cook (Independent) 2.4%Wayne Alberson (Republican) 18.9%
|}

District 1

Republican primary

Candidates
 Phil Roe, U.S. Representative
 Clint Tribble, conservative activist and YouTube personality

Results

Democratic primary

Candidates
 Alan Bohms, executive director of the Volunteer Firefighter Alliance

Results

General election

Candidates
 Phil Roe (Republican), U.S. Representative
 Alan Bohms (Democratic), Executive director of the Volunteer Firefighter Alliance
 Robert Franklin (Independent), U.S. Navy veteran
 Paul Krane (Independent write-in), student

Results

District 2

Republican primary

Candidates
 John J. Duncan, Jr., U.S. Representative

Results

Democratic primary

Candidates
 StuaRert Starr (Democratic), IT business owner and union organizer

Results

General election

Results

District 3

Republican primary
Incumbent Republican Representative Chuck Fleischmann won his primary with 84% of the vote.

Candidates
 Chuck Fleischmann, Incumbent Republican Representative
 Allan Levene
 Geoffery Suhmer Smith

Results

Democratic primary
The Democrats nominated Melody Shekari, a policy analyst for the Chattanooga Department of Transportation.

Candidates
 Michael Friedman
 George Ryan Love
 Melody Shekari

Results

General election
Shekari was endorsed by the Chattanooga Times Free Press and the Knoxville News Sentinel. Fleischmann was heavily favored to win re-election.

Results

District 4

Republican primary 
Scandal-ridden incumbent representative Scott DesJarlais had narrowly won his primary in 2012, and faced another competitive primary against Grant Starrett. While DesJarlais originally trailed Starrett in fundraising, the race tightened when a mailer sent out by the Starrett campaign sparked controversy over its alleged racism.

Results

Democratic primary 
Steven Reynolds, a manager in the construction industry, won the uncontested Democratic Primary.

Results

General election

Results

District 5

Democratic primary
Incumbent Representative Jim Cooper won the uncontested Democratic Primary.

Results

Republican primary
Stacy Reis Snyder won the Republican Primary with 50.8% of the vote.

Candidates
 Jody Ball
 John "Big John" Smith
 Stacy Ries Snyder

Results

General election 
Democrat Jim Cooper is heavily favored to win re-election due to Nashville's partisan composition.

Results

District 6

Republican primary

Candidates
 Diane Black, incumbent U.S. Representative
 Joe Carr, former state representative
 Donald Strong
 Tommy Hay

Results
Joe Carr attempted to ride anti-establishment sentiment to defeat incumbent Diane Black, who was openly considering a future run for governor. Despite a strong challenge, Black won re-election by a larger margin than expected.

Democratic primary
David Kent defeated Flo Matheson to be the Democratic nominee.

Results

General election

Results

District 7

Republican primary
Incumbent Republican Representative Marsha Blackburn and Democrat Tharon Chandler both ran in uncontested primaries.

Results

Democratic primary

Candidates
 Tharon Chandler

Results

General election
Blackburn dramatically outspent Chandler and easily won re-election.

Results

District 8 
Incumbent Republican Stephen Fincher announced he would not run for reelection. David Kustoff won the crowded Republican primary with 27% of the vote.

Republican primary

Candidates
Declared
 Ken Atkins, corrections officer and former car dealership owner
 Hunter Baker, Union University professor
 Steve Basar, Shelby County Commissioner
 George Flinn, radiologist and perennial candidate
 Brad Greer, businessman and political consultant
 Brian Kelsey, state senator
 David Kustoff, former U.S. Attorney
 Tom Leatherwood, Shelby County Register of Deeds
 Mark Luttrell, Shelby County Mayor
 David Maldonado, businessman

Declined
 Steve McManus, state representative
 Mark Norris, Majority Leader of the Tennessee Senate

Results

Democratic primary
Rickey Hobson, a manager at Delta Airlines and Fayette County resident, won the Democratic Primary with 55% of the vote.

Candidates
 Gregory Alan Frye
 Rickey Hobson

Results

General election 
The 8th District, consisting of Memphis' suburbs and much of rural West Tennessee, is strongly Republican, foreshadowing a likely Kustoff win.

Results

District 9

Democratic primary

Candidates
 Steve Cohen, incumbent U.S. Representative
 Larry Crim, perennial candidate
 Justin Ford, Shelby County Commission Chairman
 Larry Williams

Results

Republican primary

Candidates
 Wayne Alberson

Results 

Albertson won the uncontested primary.

General election

Results

See also
 United States House of Representatives elections, 2016
 United States elections, 2016

References

Tennessee
2016
2016 Tennessee elections